The M17 is a metropolitan route in Johannesburg, South Africa. It runs north from the southern suburb of Ridgeway through Mayfair a suburb just west of the Johannesburg Central Business District and ends in the north in Auckland Park. It intersect two main Johannesburg freeways, starting with an intersection to the N12 Southern Bypass and the north–south M1 freeway.

Route
The M17 has its southern terminus beginning as Xavier Street at major junction with the N12 Southern Bypass. It continues northward and after a short distance it intersects the M38 Rifle Range Road. Passing the west end of the suburb of Robertsham, it crosses the old Kimberley Road and the on and off ramps of the north–south M1 freeway. After passing over the freeway, it becomes Crownwood Road, Evans Park, intersecting as a t-junction with the M34 Ormonde Ext. before continuing northwards through the old mining lands of Crown Mines and the suburb of Theta. There it crosses under the M70 Soweto Highway without any intersections. Passing the old Langlaagte Deep Village, it intersects the east–west R41 Main Reef Road and continues north as Church Street into Mayfair.

Here in Mayfair, it intersects the east–west R24 Albertina Sisulu Road that connects Johannesburg to the West and East Rand's. It continues north briefly as Church Street before turning left into Queens Road before turning right again and intersects and co-signs briefly with M5/M10 Bartlett Way. Resuming a northward direction briefly as Brixton Road, it passes the Brixton Cemetery to its east before becoming Symons Road. It passes the Brixton Tower, Brixton and becomes Henley Road in Auckland Park passing the SABC broadcast centre. Shortly thereafter as it intersects the M18 Kingsway Avenue and becomes co-signed with the M18 up to the next junction, where the M18 becomes Annet Road south-eastwards and the M17 continues eastwards as Empire Road to reach its terminus at a junction with the M7 and M71.

References 

Streets and roads of Johannesburg
Metropolitan routes in Johannesburg